Saint Rubin is a saint of the Syriac Orthodox church. He was a stylite of Kartamin. He is commemorated with feast days of August 1 and August 4.

See also
Hermit
Simeon Stylites
Oriental Orthodoxy
Eastern Orthodoxy
Eastern Catholicism

References
Holweck, F. G. A Biographical Dictionary of the Saints. St. Louis, MO: B. Herder Book Co., 1924.

Year of birth missing
Year of death missing
Byzantine hermits
Stylites
Christian saints in unknown century